Flashing Swords! #5: Demons and Daggers is an American anthology of fantasy stories, edited by American writer Lin Carter. It was first published in hardcover by Nelson Doubleday in December 1981 as a selection in its Science Fiction Book Club, and in paperback by Dell Books simultaneously.

Summary
The book collects five heroic fantasy novelettes by members of the Swordsmen and Sorcerers' Guild of America (SAGA), an informal literary group of fantasy authors active from the 1960s to the 1980s, of which Carter was also a member and guiding force, together with a general introduction and introductions to the individual stories by the editor.

Contents
"Introduction: Where Magic Reigns" by Lin Carter
"Tower of Ice" (Dilvish) by Roger Zelazny
"A Thief in Korianth" by C. J. Cherryh
"Parting Gifts" by Diane Duane
"A Dealing with Demons" (Ebenezum) by Craig Shaw Gardner
"The Dry Season" by Tanith Lee

Awards
The book placed fifth in the 1982 Locus Poll Award for Best Anthology.

Reception
The anthology was reviewed by Jeff Frane in Locus no. 253, February 1982, and Michael E. Stamm in Science Fiction & Fantasy Book Review no. 4, May 1982.

Notes

1981 anthologies
Fantasy anthologies
Lin Carter anthologies
Heroic fantasy